Alexander Charles Beard CBE (born October 1963) was the deputy director of the Tate from 2002 to 2013. In March 2013, he was appointed as the new chief executive of the Royal Opera House, London, succeeding Tony Hall, who relinquished the post on his appointment as Director-General of the BBC. Beard took up the post at the ROH in September 2013.

Education

He was educated at Manchester Grammar School, Westminster School and King's College London (BA, Classics).

Career
Beard has spent nineteen years with the Tate and previously worked for the Arts Council England for seven years (1986–93) and for KPMG (1985-6). At the Tate, he was responsible for the business plan for the creation of Tate Modern. He has also been a member of the Board of Glyndebourne Productions Ltd since 2008.

Family
Alex Beard has a son and a daughter, Betty Rose Beard and Alfred John Wells Beard.

Honours
He was made a Commander of the Order of the British Empire (CBE) for services to the arts in the New Year Honours at the end of 2012.

References

1963 births
Living people
People educated at Manchester Grammar School
People educated at Westminster School, London
Alumni of King's College London
Fellows of King's College London
Commanders of the Order of the British Empire
British arts administrators
People associated with the Tate galleries
Royal Opera House